Sheikh Abu Mohammad Jawad Walieddine (1916 – April 27, 2012) was regarded as the highest spiritual authority amongst the Druze community encompassing Lebanon, Syria, Jordan and Israel from 1988 up to his death in 2012. From 1988 he was head of the Druze Spiritual Council, and was known as the "Sheikh of the (northern) Jazeera".

References

1916 births
2012 deaths
Lebanese Druze
Druze religious leaders